Lifosa Power Plant is a power plant in Kėdainiai, Lithuania. Its primary use is to serve the Lifosa factory.

In 2014, it had installed capacity of 37 MW.

References

Natural gas-fired power stations in Lithuania
Buildings and structures in Kėdainiai